The Cuvier's beaked whale, goose-beaked whale, or ziphius (Ziphius cavirostris) is the most widely distributed of all beaked whales in the family Ziphiidae. It is smaller than most baleen whales yet large among beaked whales. Despite its deep-water habitat, it is one of the most frequently spotted beached whales.

The species was named Ziphius cavirostris by Georges Cuvier, based on a skull fragment which he believed to be a fossil from an extinct species. He reused the genus name Ziphius from an undetermined species mentioned by historical sources. The species name cavirostris, from Latin  "hollow" and  "beak", refers to a bony structure (cavity) anterior of the nares (the bones of the nose), now known as the prenarial basin. It is now known to be unique to males of this species.

Taxonomy

French naturalist and zoologist Georges Cuvier first described the species in Recherches sur les ossements fossiles ("Research on Fossil Bones", 1823) based on a skull collected on the Mediterranean coast of France at Fos-sur-mer, Bouches de Rhone in 1804. He named it Ziphius cavirostris from the Latin cavus for "hollow" or "concave", referring to the prenarial basin, a deep hollow in the skull which is now known to be found only in males of this species.
  
Cuvier believed the skull represented the remains of an extinct species, and chose the genus name Ziphius to reflect an undetermined species mentioned by historical authors.  Later, in 1850, paleontologist and zoologist Paul Gervais found the skull to be identical with that of a whale carcass more recently stranded on a beach.

Cuvier's beaked whale is one of 22 species in the family Ziphiidae and the only member of the genus Ziphius. No other ziphiid develops the dense
rostral ossification of the prenarial basin.

Description

The body of Cuvier's beaked whale is robust and cigar-shaped, similar to those of other beaked whales, and can be difficult to distinguish from many of the mesoplodont whales at sea.  
Males and females tend to be similar in size.
The body of adult males is typically a dark gray, with their head being distinctly lighter, or even white. This light coloration extends along the posterior. Females vary in color from dark gray to a reddish-brown. The skin lightens on female's head to a lesser extent than in males, and does not extend along the posterior.

Sex determination in Cuvier’s beaked whales can be on the basis of genetics, observation of the genital area, the presence or absence of erupted teeth in adults, or presence of a calf. Pigmentation patterns can also give indications of gender. Adult males show a contrasted uniform white cape which usually extends to the dorsal fin zone. Individual coloration in adult males varies from dark to almost white. However, more than a third of adult females show "sharp" pigmentation patterns similar to adult males. Therefore males and females of this pattern cannot be distinguished using pigmentation pattern alone. The majority of adult females show a “soft” cluster of pigmentation features characterized by a brownish coloration and a shorter contrasting white cape. However, similar patterns have been observed in subadult animals of both sexes, so a "soft" pigmentation pattern alone is insufficient evidence to conclude that an animal is female. 

Calves are black or dark blue with a white belly.

Cuvier's beaked whale is an odontocete — or toothed whale. Erupted teeth are only present in the adult males.  Males also develop two tusks in the right and left corners of their lower jaw. The tusks are possibly used for dueling between the males, though it has not been observed, but may also be used for fighting off threats such as orcas. Adults have many scars along their sides which can be used to identify individuals. The scars are thought, by researchers, to be from battles with males, predators, fights with squid, or cookiecutter sharks, which may score them or punch holes directly in their sides. The frequency of scarring is higher in males than in females, and tends to increase with age.

Their head is short and blunt, with a gradually sloping forehead, a small, poorly defined beak, and a slight  melon. All the beaked whales have this general appearance, but Cuvier's beaked whale has a blunt shorter beak that distinguishes the Cuvier's beaked whale from others in the family Ziphiidae. In profile, their small, softly defined rostrum gives them the nickname or alternative name of goose-beaked whale.

Ecology

Diving 
Satellite-linked tags have been used to track and study whale movement. Cuvier's beaked whales typically display very short surface intervals (2 to 8 min), but infrequently spend extended intervals at the surface  (30 to 310 min). Diving behavior shows little diel variation.

Cuvier's beaked whales hold the records for both the deepest dive ever documented for any mammal and the longest dive ever documented for any mammal. A study in 2020 reported a Cuvier's beaked whale making a dive that lasted 222 minutes, the longest dive ever documented for any mammal. Supervising scientist Nicola Hodgkins noted that "the recorded dive-time of more than three hours is likely not typical, and instead the result of an individual pushed to its absolute limits".

It is possible that Cuvier's beaked whales have developed alterations in metabolism and behavior that enable them to make deep dives beyond their predicted aerobic capacity.
Considering Cuvier beaked whale's ability to dive to almost   and remain underwater for hours, there are suggestions that they may be able to collapse their rib cage and possibly lungs. They are observed to make a leaping flourish when entering a dive into the pelagic depths.

During shallow dives, Cuvier's beaked whales tend to be silent, possibly to avoid predators.  Below  they use echolocation as part of foraging. 
Exposure to high noise levels from anthropogenic sources, such as Navy sonar, appears to disrupt their behavior and has been linked to multiple mass stranding events affecting beaked whales.

Food and foraging

Relatively little is known of the diving and feeding behavior of Cuvier’s beaked whales. There is evidence that Cuvier's beaked whales make highly coordinated foraging dives in small social groups.  Such behavior may reduce predation risk; it does not appear to affect the whales' foraging success.

It appears that Cuvier's beaked whale prefers diving deep and using a suction process to acquire fish.  Diving deep to catch prey, Cuvier's beaked whales open their jaws, expand their throat and move their tongue in a way that creates a pressure change and sucks their prey, like squid and deep sea fish, directly into their mouths.  Grooves between their throat tissues enable the whale to expand this region. Its jaw structure gives it a smiling appearance.

The "melon" of the whale, the bump on top of its head, contains its organ for echolocation. This means the whale can use sound waves to locate potential sources of food, which is helpful in the deep sea, where there is no sunlight. This deep diving with echolocation seems to help Cuvier's beaked whales avoid competition for their prey.

Scientists have used beached specimens to study the whale's eating habits via stomach analysis. Examining Pacific Ocean whales, they found that  cephalopods made up 98.0% (by number) and 87.7% (by mass) of the Cuvier's beaked whale diet.  Among these were at least 37 varieties of squid, of many different sizes, with both mesopelagic and bathypelagic squid. Prey of Cuvier’s beaked whales include Cranchiidae, Onychoteuthidae, Brachioteuthidae, Enoploteuthidae, Octopoteuthidae, and Histioteuthidae, as well as deep-sea fish. 

Comparing the stomachs of the whales found in the Pacific Ocean to those found in the Mediterranean found that the Mediterranean whales predominantly ate squid from a 1,000 to 2,000-foot level, whereas in the Pacific, the whales found in Monterey, California in 2015, Taiwan in 1995, Alaska, and Baja California had access to much deeper water.

As well as catching prey in the benthopelagic zone, they consumed a mixture of crustaceans and cephalopods further down in the bathypelagic zone. Molluscs and octopus only found in these deep-sea regions are also sometimes eaten in the bathypelagic zone.
A whale retrieved in Monterey in 2015 was observed to have eaten 200 squids, five fish, and one very deep-sea shrimp. The shrimp and most of the squid were seemingly bathypelagic, and the fish were giant grenadiers off the benthopelagic ocean bottoms.

Range and habitat
Cuvier's has a cosmopolitan distribution in deep, offshore waters from the tropics to the cool, temperate seas. In the North Pacific, it occurs as far north as the Aleutians and in the North Atlantic as far north as Atlantic Canada in the west to Shetland in the east. In the Southern Hemisphere, it occurs as far south as Tierra del Fuego, South Africa, southern Australia, New Zealand, and the Chatham Islands. It also frequents such inland bodies of waters as the Gulfs of Mexico and the Caribbean and Mediterranean Seas. The Mediterranean population might be genetically distinct from the North Atlantic population(s).

Cuvier's beaked whale may be one of the most common and abundant of the beaked whales, with a worldwide population likely well over 100,000. An estimated 80,000 are in the eastern tropical Pacific, nearly 1,900 are off the west coast of the United States (excluding Alaska), and more than 15,000 are off Hawaii. The population in the Gulf of Mexico is extremely small and appeals have been made to have them made a protected species in this area.  this was rejected on the basis that there was insufficient scientific evidence to consider them a distinct population segment (DPS) under the Endangered Species Act (ESA).

Interactions with humans

Whaling and fishing 
Before 1955, it is estimated that Japanese whalers caught anywhere from 3 to 35 Cuvier's every year. From 1955 until the 1990s, more than 4,000 Cuvier's beaked whales were reportedly caught. The species has reportedly been caught incidentally in fisheries in Colombia, in the Italian swordfish fishery, and in a drift gillnet fishery off California and Oregon on the U.S. west coast, where between 22 and 44 individuals died each year from 1992 to 1995. Cuvier's beaked whale is covered by the Agreement on the Conservation of Small Cetaceans of the Baltic, North East Atlantic, Irish and North Seas (ASCOBANS) and the Agreement on the Conservation of Cetaceans in the Black Sea, the Mediterranean Sea and Contiguous Atlantic Area (ACCOBAMS). The species is further included in the Memorandum of Understanding Concerning the Conservation of the Manatee and Small Cetaceans of Western Africa and Macaronesia (Western African Aquatic Mammals MoU) and the Memorandum of Understanding for the Conservation of Cetaceans and Their Habitats in the Pacific Islands Region (Pacific Cetaceans MoU).

Sonar and military maneuvers 

Cuvier's beaked whale seems to have a bad reaction to sonar. Strandings and beachings often occur near naval bases where sonar may have been in use. Cuvier's beaked whale has been observed in Hawaii avoiding diving for food or avoiding an area where sonar is in use. A higher incidence of strandings has been recorded in noisy seas such as the Mediterranean and multiple mass strandings have occurred following operations by the Spanish Navy in the Canary Islands. In 2019, a review of evidence on the mass strandings of beaked whales linked to naval exercises where sonar was used concluded the effects of mid-frequency active sonar are strongest on Cuvier's beaked whales but vary among individuals or populations, and the strength of the whales' response may depend on whether the individuals had prior exposure to sonar. The report considered the most plausible explanation of the symptoms of decompression sickness such as gas embolism found in stranded whales to be the whales' response to sonar. It noted no more mass strandings had occurred in the Canary Islands once naval exercises using sonar were banned there, and recommended the ban be extended to other areas such as the Mediterranean, where mass strandings continue to occur.

See also

List of cetaceans

References

Further reading

External links
 
 
 

Mammals described in 1823
Taxa named by Georges Cuvier
Cetaceans of the Indian Ocean
Cetaceans of the Pacific Ocean
Cetaceans of Europe
Mammals of Southeast Asia
Ziphiids
Cetaceans of the Atlantic Ocean